The 1995 Toronto Blue Jays season was the franchise's 19th season of Major League Baseball. It resulted in the Blue Jays finishing fifth in the American League East with a record of 56 wins and 88 losses.

Offseason
 October 11, 1994: Dave Righetti was released by the Blue Jays.
 December 5, 1994: Rob Butler was sent by the Blue Jays to the Philadelphia Phillies as part of a conditional deal.
 December 14, 1994: Danny Cox was signed as a free agent by the Blue Jays.
 January 18, 1995: Scott Bailes was released by the Toronto Blue Jays.

Regular season

Season standings

Record vs. opponents

Notable transactions
 April 6, 1995: Chris Stynes, David Sinnes (minors), and Tony Medrano (minors) were traded by the Blue Jays to the Kansas City Royals for David Cone.
 April 10, 1995: Danny Darwin was signed as a free agent by the Blue Jays.
 April 12, 1995: Candy Maldonado was signed as a free agent by the Blue Jays.
 April 24, 1995: Frank Viola was signed as a free agent by the Blue Jays.
 April 26, 1995: Aaron Small was traded by the Blue Jays to the Florida Marlins for a player to be named later. The Marlins completed the deal by sending Ernie Delgado (minors) to the Blue Jays on September 19.
 June 1, 1995: 1995 Major League Baseball draft
Roy Halladay was drafted by the Blue Jays in the 1st round (17th pick). Player signed June 30, 1995.
Ryan Freel was drafted by the Blue Jays in the 10th round.
 July 18, 1995: Danny Darwin was released by the Blue Jays.
 July 25, 1995: Frank Viola was released by the Blue Jays.
 July 28, 1995: David Cone was traded by the Blue Jays to the New York Yankees for Marty Janzen, Jason Jarvis (minors), and Mike Gordon (minors).
 August 1, 1995: Wally Whitehurst was signed as a free agent with the Blue Jays.
 August 31, 1995: Candy Maldonado was sent by the Toronto Blue Jays to the Texas Rangers as part of a conditional deal.

Roster

Game log

|- align="center" bgcolor="bbffbb"
| 1 || April 26 || Athletics || 13–1 || Cone (1–0) || Stewart (0–1) || || 50,426 || 1–0
|- align="center" bgcolor="bbffbb"
| 2 || April 27 || Athletics || 7–1 || Hentgen (1–0) || Darling (0–1) || || 31,070 || 2–0
|- align="center" bgcolor="ffbbbb"
| 3 || April 28 || Angels || 7 – 6 (10) || Butcher (1–0) || Castillo (0–1) || Smith (1) || 36,208 || 2–1
|- align="center" bgcolor="bbffbb"
| 4 || April 29 || Angels || 3–0 || Leiter (1–0) || Sanderson (0–1) || Hall (1) || 35,278 || 3–1
|- align="center" bgcolor="ffbbbb"
| 5 || April 30 || Angels || 5–3 || Butcher (2–0) || Menhart (0–1) || Smith (2) || 35,290 || 3–2
|-

|- align="center" bgcolor="ffbbbb"
| 6 || May 1 || Angels || 2–0 || Boskie (1–0) || Cone (1–1) || Smith (3) || 31,303 || 3–3
|- align="center" bgcolor="bbffbb"
| 7 || May 2 || White Sox || 9–8 || Timlin (1–0) || Márquez (0–1) || || 34,194 || 4–3
|- align="center" bgcolor="bbffbb"
| 8 || May 3 || White Sox || 8 – 7 (10) || Menhart (1–1) || Hernández (0–1)  || || 33,159 || 5–3
|- align="center" bgcolor="ffbbbb"
| 9 || May 5 || @ Orioles || 9–2 || Brown (2–0) || Leiter (1–1) || || 37,670 || 5–4
|- align="center" bgcolor="bbffbb"
| 10 || May 6 || @ Orioles || 7–3 || Darwin (1–0) || Rhodes (1–1) || || 40,173 || 6–4
|- align="center" bgcolor="ffbbbb"
| 11 || May 7 || @ Orioles || 6–2 || Mussina (1–1) || Cone (1–2) || || 44,304 || 6–5
|- align="center" bgcolor="bbffbb"
| 12 || May 9 || Yankees || 9–6 || Hentgen (2–0) || McDowell (1–1) || || 37,291 || 7–5
|- align="center" bgcolor="ffbbbb"
| 13 || May 10 || Yankees || 6 – 4 (11) || Wetteland (1–0) || Williams (0–1)  || || 38,232 || 7–6
|- align="center" bgcolor="ffbbbb"
| 14 || May 11 || Yankees || 12–11 || Ausanio (2–0) || Ward (0–1) || Howe (1) || 39,370 || 7–7
|- align="center" bgcolor="ffbbbb"
| 15 || May 12 || @ Brewers || 14–5 || Ignasiak (2–0) || Darwin (1–1) || || 12,904 || 7–8
|- align="center" bgcolor="bbffbb"
| 16 || May 13 || @ Brewers || 10–0 || Cone (2–2) || Miranda (1–1) || || 17,984 || 8–8
|- align="center" bgcolor="bbffbb"
| 17 || May 14 || @ Brewers || 8–3 || Hentgen (3–0) || Eldred (1–1) || || 13,447 || 9–8
|- align="center" bgcolor="ffbbbb"
| 18 || May 15 || @ Rangers || 12–4 || Tewksbury (2–1) || Guzmán (0–1) || || 17,982 || 9–9
|- align="center" bgcolor="ffbbbb"
| 19 || May 16 || @ Rangers || 6–1 || Rogers (3–2) || Leiter (1–2) || Burrows (1) || 19,014 || 9–10
|- align="center" bgcolor="ffbbbb"
| 20 || May 17 || @ Rangers || 12–7 || Gross (1–3) || Darwin (1–2) || Vosberg (1) || 18,910 || 9–11
|- align="center" bgcolor="bbffbb"
| 21 || May 19 || @ Tigers || 4–2 || Cone (3–2) || Moore (3–2) || || 18,558 || 10–11
|- align="center" bgcolor="ffbbbb"
| 22 || May 20 || @ Tigers || 10–6 || Doherty (2–2) || Hentgen (3–1) || || 18,888 || 10–12
|- align="center" bgcolor="ffbbbb"
| 23 || May 21 || @ Tigers || 2–1 || Boever (2–0) || Cox (0–1) || Henneman (3) || 19,144 || 10–13
|- align="center" bgcolor="ffbbbb"
| 24 || May 22 || Royals || 7–0 || Appier (5–1) || Darwin (1–3) || || 39,255 || 10–14
|- align="center" bgcolor="bbffbb"
| 25 || May 23 || Royals || 10–6 || Timlin (2–0) || Pichardo (0–1) || Hall (2) || 35,049 || 11–14
|- align="center" bgcolor="ffbbbb"
| 26 || May 24 || Royals || 8–5 || Gordon (2–1) || Cone (3–3) || || 37,277 || 11–15
|- align="center" bgcolor="ffbbbb"
| 27 || May 26 || Indians || 7–4 || Hershiser (3–1) || Hentgen (3–2) || Mesa (7) || 47,113 || 11–16
|- align="center" bgcolor="bbffbb"
| 28 || May 27 || Indians || 3–0 || Leiter (2–2) || Plunk (2–1) || Hall (3) || 47,143 || 12–16
|- align="center" bgcolor="ffbbbb"
| 29 || May 28 || Indians || 5–4 || Nagy (3–1) || Darwin (1–4) || Mesa (8) || 42,365 || 12–17
|- align="center" bgcolor="bbffbb"
| 30 || May 29 || Tigers || 5–4 || Cone (4–3) || Moore (4–3) || Timlin (1) || 39,294 || 13–17
|- align="center" bgcolor="ffbbbb"
| 31 || May 30 || Tigers || 8–6 || Lira (1–3) || Cox (0–2) || Henneman (5) || 39,711 || 13–18
|- align="center" bgcolor="bbffbb"
| 32 || May 31 || Tigers || 5–3 || Hentgen (4–2) || Doherty (2–3) || || 41,232 || 14–18
|-

|- align="center" bgcolor="bbffbb"
| 33 || June 2 || @ Indians || 5–0 || Leiter (3–2) || Nagy (3–2) || Timlin (2) || 41,545 || 15–18
|- align="center" bgcolor="ffbbbb"
| 34 || June 3 || @ Indians || 3–0 || Martínez (5–0) || Darwin (1–5) || || 41,566 || 15–19
|- align="center" bgcolor="ffbbbb"
| 35 || June 4 || @ Indians || 9–8 || Tavárez (3–0) || Hall (0–1) || || 41,688 || 15–20
|- align="center" bgcolor="ffbbbb"
| 36 || June 5 || @ White Sox || 3–2 || Abbott (3–2) || Guzmán (0–2) || Hernández (9) || 22,180 || 15–21
|- align="center" bgcolor="ffbbbb"
| 37 || June 6 || @ White Sox || 6–4 || Bere (2–4) || Hentgen (4–3) || Hernández (10) || 18,428 || 15–22
|- align="center" bgcolor="bbffbb"
| 38 || June 7 || @ White Sox || 4–3 || Leiter (4–2) || Keyser (0–1) || Timlin (3) || 19,749 || 16–22
|- align="center" bgcolor="bbbbbb"
| – || June 9 || @ Royals || colspan=6|Postponed (rain) Rescheduled for September 4
|- align="center" bgcolor="ffbbbb"
| 39 || June 10 || @ Royals || 8–2 || Appier (8–2) || Darwin (1–6) || || 20,883 || 16–23
|- align="center" bgcolor="ffbbbb"
| 40 || June 11 || @ Royals || 3 – 2 (10)|| Pichardo (3–1) || Hall (0–2) || || 16,881 || 16–24
|- align="center" bgcolor="bbffbb"
| 41 || June 12 || Red Sox || 4 – 3 (12)|| Timlin (3–0) || Ryan (0–2) || || 40,171 || 17–24
|- align="center" bgcolor="ffbbbb"
| 42 || June 13 || Red Sox || 11–7 || Maddux (1–1) || Hentgen (4–4) || || 36,297 || 17–25
|- align="center" bgcolor="bbffbb"
| 43 || June 14 || Red Sox || 5–3 || Leiter (5–2) || Wakefield (4–1) || Castillo (1) || 37,898 || 18–25
|- align="center" bgcolor="ffbbbb"
| 44 || June 16 || Rangers || 7–3 || Tewksbury (5–2) || Darwin (1–7) || || 38,150 || 18–26
|- align="center" bgcolor="bbffbb"
| 45 || June 17 || Rangers || 4–3 || Cone (5–3) || Rogers (7–3) || || 45,229 || 19–26
|- align="center" bgcolor="bbffbb"
| 46 || June 18 || Rangers || 7–2 || Guzmán (1–2) || Pavlik (4–2) || || 40,215 || 20–26
|- align="center" bgcolor="ffbbbb"
| 47 || June 20 || Brewers || 5–3 || Roberson (3–2) || Hentgen (4–5) || Fetters (6) || 39,456 || 20–27
|- align="center" bgcolor="ffbbbb"
| 48 || June 21 || Brewers || 10–9 || Wegman (1–3) || Timlin (3–1) || Fetters (7) || 40,296 || 20–28
|- align="center" bgcolor="ffbbbb"
| 49 || June 22 || Brewers || 9–0 || Sparks (3–2) || Darwin (1–8) || || 43,490 || 20–29
|- align="center" bgcolor="ffbbbb"
| 50 || June 23 || @ Yankees || 6–2 || McDowell (4–4) || Cone (5–4) || || 24,499 || 20–30
|- align="center" bgcolor="ffbbbb"
| 51 || June 24 || @ Yankees || 10–2 || Pérez (5–4) || Guzmán (1–3) || || 28,950 || 20–31
|- align="center" bgcolor="ffbbbb"
| 52 || June 25 || @ Yankees || 8–2 || Hitchcock (3–4) || Hentgen (4–6) || || 26,340 || 20–32
|- align="center" bgcolor="ffbbbb"
| 53 || June 26 || @ Red Sox || 4–3 || Belinda (5–0) || Castillo (0–2) || || 26,716 || 20–33
|- align="center" bgcolor="ffbbbb"
| 54 || June 27 || @ Red Sox || 6 – 5 (11)|| Lilliquist (2–1) || Williams (0–2) || || 30,262 || 20–34
|- align="center" bgcolor="bbffbb"
| 55 || June 28 || @ Red Sox || 8–4 || Cone (6–4) || Smith (2–4) || || 31,467 || 21–34
|- align="center" bgcolor="bbffbb"
| 56 || June 29 || Orioles || 5–1 || Guzmán (2–3) || Fernandez (0–4) || || 40,173 || 22–34
|- align="center" bgcolor="bbffbb"
| 57 || June 30 || Orioles || 6–5 || Cox (1–2) || Clark (0–1) || || 38,416 || 23–34
|-

|- align="center" bgcolor="ffbbbb"
| 58 || July 1 || Orioles || 6–2 || Moyer (3–3) || Leiter (5–3) || || 43,375 || 23–35
|- align="center" bgcolor="ffbbbb"
| 59 || July 2 || Orioles || 9–7 || Benítez (1–3) || Crabtree (0–1) || Jones (12) || 42,226 || 23–36
|- align="center" bgcolor="ffbbbb"
| 60 || July 3 || @ Angels || 4–2 || Langston (7–1) || Cone (6–5) || Smith (20) || 17,848 || 23–37
|- align="center" bgcolor="ffbbbb"
| 61 || July 4 || @ Angels || 14–0 || Finley (7–6) || Guzmán (2–4) || || 61,292 || 23–38
|- align="center" bgcolor="bbffbb"
| 62 || July 5 || @ Angels || 6–5 || Hentgen (5–6) || Boskie (6–2) || Castillo (2) || 14,163 || 24–38
|- align="center" bgcolor="ffbbbb"
| 63 || July 6 || @ Angels || 10–1 || Anderson (2–2) || Leiter (5–4) || || 15,076 || 24–39
|- align="center" bgcolor="bbffbb"
| 64 || July 7 || @ Athletics || 4–2 || Williams (1–2) || Prieto (0–1) || Castillo (3) || 14,522 || 25–39
|- align="center" bgcolor="bbffbb"
| 65 || July 8 || @ Athletics || 9–6 || Cone (7–5) || Harkey (4–6) || || || 26–39
|- align="center" bgcolor="ffbbbb"
| 66 || July 8 || @ Athletics || 6–3 || Eckersley (2–2) || Guzmán (2–5) || || 25,103 || 26–40
|- align="center" bgcolor="bbffbb"
| 67 || July 9 || @ Athletics || 7–3 || Hentgen (6–6) || Darling (2–4) || || 20,253 || 27–40
|- align="center" bgcolor="ffbbbb"
| 68 || July 12 || @ Athletics || 7–4 || Stottlemyre (8–2) || Leiter (5–5) || Eckersley (19) || 11,343 || 27–41
|- align="center" bgcolor="bbffbb"
| 69 || July 13 || @ Mariners || 4–1 || Cone (8–5) || Belcher (4–5) || Castillo (4) || 18,616 || 28–41
|- align="center" bgcolor="bbffbb"
| 70 || July 14 || @ Mariners || 5–1 || Guzmán (3–5) || Bosio (6–4) || || 14,850 || 29–41
|- align="center" bgcolor="ffbbbb"
| 71 || July 15 || @ Mariners || 3–0 || Johnson (10–1) || Hentgen (6–7) || || 36,037 || 29–42
|- align="center" bgcolor="bbffbb"
| 72 || July 16 || @ Mariners || 9–3 || Hurtado (1–0) || Carmona (1–4) || || 17,632 || 30–42
|- align="center" bgcolor="bbffbb"
| 73 || July 17 || @ Twins || 6–3 || Leiter (6–5) || Harris (0–3) || Castillo (5) || 15,415 || 31–42
|- align="center" bgcolor="bbffbb"
| 74 || July 18 || @ Twins || 7–0 || Cone (9–5) || Tapani (4–11) || || 16,534 || 32–42
|- align="center" bgcolor="ffbbbb"
| 75 || July 19 || Angels || 10–2 || Springer (1–2) || Guzmán (3–6) || || 39,139 || 32–43
|- align="center" bgcolor="ffbbbb"
| 76 || July 20 || Angels || 10–3 || Butcher (6–1) || Hentgen (6–8) || || 37,194 || 32–44
|- align="center" bgcolor="bbffbb"
| 77 || July 21 || Mariners || 4–3 || Hurtado (2–0) || Torres (3–5) || Castillo (6) || 36,490 || 33–44
|- align="center" bgcolor="ffbbbb"
| 78 || July 22 || Mariners || 7–2 || Belcher (6–5) || Leiter (6–6) || || 43,483 || 33–45
|- align="center" bgcolor="ffbbbb"
| 79 || July 23 || Mariners || 6–4 || Wells (3–3) || Cone (9–6) || Ayala (14) || 39,163 || 33–46
|- align="center" bgcolor="ffbbbb"
| 80 || July 25 || Twins || 7–3 || Rodriguez (2–3) || Guzmán (3–7) || || 37,609 || 33–47
|- align="center" bgcolor="bbffbb"
| 81 || July 26 || Twins || 6–2 || Hentgen (7–8) || Trombley (1–6) || || 37,150 || 34–47
|- align="center" bgcolor="bbffbb"
| 82 || July 27 || Twins || 9–2 || Hurtado (3–0) || Harris (0–4) || || 42,154 || 35–47
|- align="center" bgcolor="bbffbb"
| 83 || July 28 || Athletics || 3–0 || Leiter (7–6) || Van Poppel (1–3) || Castillo (7) || 40,461 || 36–47
|- align="center" bgcolor="bbffbb"
| 84 || July 29 || Athletics || 18–11 || Carrara (1–0) || Prieto (1–4) || || 41,040 || 37–47
|- align="center" bgcolor="ffbbbb"
| 85 || July 30 || Athletics || 11–3 || Darling (4–6) || Guzmán (3–8) || || 40,312 || 37–48
|- align="center" bgcolor="bbffbb"
| 86 || July 31 || @ Orioles || 6–3 || Hentgen (8–8) || Moyer (6–4) || Jordan (1) || 41,937 || 38–48
|-

|- align="center" bgcolor="bbffbb"
| 87 || August 1 || @ Orioles || 12–10 || Robinson (1–0) || Jones (0–4) || Castillo (8) || 41,394 || 39–48
|- align="center" bgcolor="ffbbbb"
| 88 || August 2 || @ Orioles || 1–0 || Mussina (13–5) || Menhart (1–2) || || 40,023 || 39–49
|- align="center" bgcolor="bbffbb"
| 89 || August 3 || @ Orioles || 8 – 2 (10)|| Jordan (1–0) || Clark (1–2) || || 43,325 || 40–49
|- align="center" bgcolor="ffbbbb"
| 90 || August 4 || Red Sox || 7–1 || Hanson (9–4) || Rogers (0–1) || || 40,137 || 40–50
|- align="center" bgcolor="ffbbbb"
| 91 || August 5 || Red Sox || 9–3 || Cormier (4–2) || Hentgen (8–9) || || 41,454 || 40–51
|- align="center" bgcolor="ffbbbb"
| 92 || August 6 || Red Sox || 6–4 || Eshelman (4–2) || Hurtado (3–1) || Aguilera (20) || 38,194 || 40–52
|- align="center" bgcolor="ffbbbb"
| 93 || August 7 || Red Sox || 5 – 4 (10)|| Belinda (8–1) || Crabtree (0–2) || || 42,135 || 40–53
|- align="center" bgcolor="ffbbbb"
| 94 || August 8 || @ Brewers || 6 – 5 (11)|| Wegman (5–4) || Rogers (0–2) || || 18,222 || 40–54
|- align="center" bgcolor="ffbbbb"
| 95 || August 9 || @ Brewers || 12–7 || Karl (3–2) || Guzmán (3–9) || || 18,417 || 40–55
|- align="center" bgcolor="bbffbb"
| 96 || August 10 || @ Brewers || 8–4 || Hentgen (9–9) || Sparks (7–6) || Castillo (9) || 17,661 || 41–55
|- align="center" bgcolor="bbffbb"
| 97 || August 11 || @ Rangers || 14–5 || Hurtado (4–1) || Pavlik (6–7) || || 31,269 || 42–55
|- align="center" bgcolor="ffbbbb"
| 98 || August 12 || @ Rangers || 6–3 || Witt (1–0) || Leiter (7–7) || McDowell (3) || 40,040 || 42–56
|- align="center" bgcolor="ffbbbb"
| 99 || August 13 || @ Rangers || 6–1 || Gross (6–11) || Carrara (1–1) || || 25,308 || 42–57
|- align="center" bgcolor="ffbbbb"
| 100 || August 15 || @ Tigers || 11–5 || Bohanon (1–1) || Hentgen (9–10) || || 19,173 || 42–58
|- align="center" bgcolor="bbffbb"
| 101 || August 16 || @ Tigers || 7–4 || Hurtado (5–1) || Maxcy (4–3) || Castillo (10) || 17,551 || 43–58
|- align="center" bgcolor="bbffbb"
| 102 || August 17 || @ Tigers || 3–0 || Leiter (8–7) || Lima (1–4) || Castillo (11) || 14,629 || 44–58
|- align="center" bgcolor="ffbbbb"
| 103 || August 18 || Royals || 10–3 || Gordon (8–8) || Carrara (1–2) || || 41,168 || 44–59
|- align="center" bgcolor="bbffbb"
| 104 || August 19 || Royals || 5 – 4 (13)|| Rogers (1–2) || Montgomery (1–2) || || 40,128 || 45–59
|- align="center" bgcolor="bbffbb"
| 105 || August 20 || Royals || 4–3 || Timlin (4–1) || Olson (1–1) || || 39,103 || 46–59
|- align="center" bgcolor="ffbbbb"
| 106 || August 21 || Indians || 7–3 || Hershiser (11–5) || Hurtado (5–2) || Embree (1) || 39,187 || 46–60
|- align="center" bgcolor="bbffbb"
| 107 || August 22 || Indians || 5–4 || Castillo (1–2) || Tavárez (8–2) || || 39,293 || 47–60
|- align="center" bgcolor="ffbbbb"
| 108 || August 23 || Indians || 6–5 || Poole (3–3) || Carrara (1–3) || Mesa (38) || 41,169 || 47–61
|- align="center" bgcolor="ffbbbb"
| 109 || August 25 || White Sox || 8–7 || Bere (6–11) || Hentgen (9–11) || Hernández (22) || 38,684 || 47–62
|- align="center" bgcolor="bbffbb"
| 110 || August 26 || White Sox || 3–2 || Rogers (2–2) || Hernández (2–7) || || 45,624 || 48–62
|- align="center" bgcolor="bbffbb"
| 111 || August 27 || White Sox || 2–1 || Leiter (9–7) || Righetti (3–2) || Castillo (12) || 40,179 || 49–62
|- align="center" bgcolor="ffbbbb"
| 112 || August 28 || @ Indians || 9–1 || Ogea (7–3) || Carrara (1–4) || || 40,283 || 49–63
|- align="center" bgcolor="ffbbbb"
| 113 || August 29 || @ Indians || 4–1 || Clark (8–5) || Guzmán (3–10) || || 41,257 || 49–64
|- align="center" bgcolor="ffbbbb"
| 114 || August 30 || @ Indians || 4 – 3 (14)|| Assenmacher (6–2) || Castillo (1–3) || || 41,807 || 49–65
|- align="center" bgcolor="ffbbbb"
| 115 || August 31 || @ Indians || 6 – 4 (10)|| Mesa (2–0) || Rogers (2–3) || || 41,746 || 49–66
|-

|- align="center" bgcolor="ffbbbb"
| 116 || September 1 || @ White Sox || 5–3 || Keyser (4–6) || Leiter (9–8) || Hernández (25) || 18,444 || 49–67
|- align="center" bgcolor="ffbbbb"
| 117 || September 2 || @ White Sox || 10–4 || Álvarez (7–7) || Ware (0–1) || || 24,369 || 49–68
|- align="center" bgcolor="ffbbbb"
| 118 || September 3 || @ White Sox || 6–5 || Simas (1–0) || Guzmán (3–11) || Hernández (26) || 23,428 || 49–69
|- align="center" bgcolor="bbffbb"
| 119 || September 4 || @ Royals || 6–1 || Hentgen (10–11) || Gubicza (10–12) || Timlin (4) || || 50–69
|- align="center" bgcolor="ffbbbb"
| 120 || September 4 || @ Royals || 9–7 || Magnante (1–1) || Castillo (1–4) || Montgomery (27) || 19,905 || 50–70
|- align="center" bgcolor="ffbbbb"
| 121 || September 5 || @ Royals || 9 – 8 (10)|| Olson (3–1) || Robinson (1–1) || || 12,443 || 50–71
|- align="center" bgcolor="bbffbb"
| 122 || September 6 || @ Royals || 6–2 || Leiter (10–8) || Gordon (10–10) || || 13,030 || 51–71
|- align="center" bgcolor="bbffbb"
| 123 || September 8 || Tigers || 9–5 || Ware (1–1) || Lira (9–10) || || 36,490 || 52–71
|- align="center" bgcolor="ffbbbb"
| 124 || September 9 || Tigers || 5–2 || Bergman (7–8) || Guzmán (3–12) || Henry (2) || 43,127 || 52–72
|- align="center" bgcolor="ffbbbb"
| 125 || September 10 || Tigers || 5 – 2 (11)|| Doherty (5–8) || Timlin (4–2) || Henry (3) || 39,255 || 52–73
|- align="center" bgcolor="ffbbbb"
| 126 || September 11 || Tigers || 3 – 2 (10)|| Christopher (3–0) || Rogers (2–4) || Bohanon (1) || 32,135 || 52–74
|- align="center" bgcolor="ffbbbb"
| 127 || September 12 || Rangers || 6–5 || McDowell (6–3) || Leiter (10–9) || Russell (19) || 32,178 || 52–75
|- align="center" bgcolor="ffbbbb"
| 128 || September 13 || Rangers || 3 – 2 (11)|| Whiteside (5–4) || Timlin (4–3) || || 32,130 || 52–76
|- align="center" bgcolor="ffbbbb"
| 129 || September 14 || Rangers || 6–1 || Witt (3–2) || Guzmán (3–13) || || 32,143 || 52–77
|- align="center" bgcolor="ffbbbb"
| 130 || September 15 || Brewers || 5 – 1 (15)|| Kiefer (4–1) || Robinson (1–2) || || 34,164 || 52–78
|- align="center" bgcolor="bbffbb"
| 131 || September 16 || Brewers || 5 – 4 (11)|| Carrara (2–4) || Wegman (5–7) || || 43,164 || 53–78
|- align="center" bgcolor="bbffbb"
| 132 || September 17 || Brewers || 5–0 || Leiter (11–9) || Givens (5–5) || || 38,191 || 54–78
|- align="center" bgcolor="ffbbbb"
| 133 || September 18 || @ Yankees || 9–2 || Cone (16–8) || Cox (1–3) || || 15,224 || 54–79
|- align="center" bgcolor="ffbbbb"
| 134 || September 19 || @ Yankees || 5–3 || Pettitte (11–8) || Guzmán (3–14) || Wetteland (26) || 15,772 || 54–80
|- align="center" bgcolor="ffbbbb"
| 135 || September 20 || @ Yankees || 2–1 || Hitchcock (9–10) || Hentgen (10–12) || || 20,541 || 54–81
|- align="center" bgcolor="ffbbbb"
| 136 || September 21 || @ Yankees || 6–4 || Howe (6–3) || Menhart (1–3) || Wetteland (27) || 17,766 || 54–82
|- align="center" bgcolor="bbbbbb"
| – || September 22 || @ Red Sox || colspan=6|Postponed (rain) Rescheduled for September 23
|- align="center" bgcolor="ffbbbb"
| 137 || September 23 || @ Red Sox || 5–0 || Clemens (9–5) || Leiter (11–10) || || 32,791 || 54–83
|- align="center" bgcolor="bbffbb"
| 138 || September 23 || @ Red Sox || 8–6 || Ware (2–1) || Wakefield (16–6) || Castillo (13) || 21,266 || 55–83
|- align="center" bgcolor="bbffbb"
| 139 || September 24 || @ Red Sox || 2–1 || Guzmán (4–14) || Aguilera (3–3) || Timlin (5) || 32,472 || 56–83
|- align="center" bgcolor="ffbbbb"
| 140 || September 26 || Orioles || 5–0 || Mussina (18–9) || Hentgen (10–13) || || 35,414 || 56–84
|- align="center" bgcolor="ffbbbb"
| 141 || September 27 || Orioles || 7–0 || Erickson (13–10) || Menhart (1–4) || || 35,019 || 56–85
|- align="center" bgcolor="ffbbbb"
| 142 || September 29 || Yankees || 4–3 || Pettitte (12–9) || Castillo (1–5) || Wetteland (31) || 40,318 || 56–86
|- align="center" bgcolor="ffbbbb"
| 143 || September 30 || Yankees || 6–1 || Kamieniecki (7–6) || Leiter (11–11) || || 49,233 || 56–87
|-

|- align="center" bgcolor="ffbbbb"
| 144 || October 1 || Yankees || 6–1 || Hitchcock (11–10) || Hentgen (10–14) || || 47,182 || 56–88
|-

| *A MLB Players strike, which ended on April 2, resulted in a reduced schedule of 144 games being played in 1995.

Player stats

Batting

Starters by position
Note: Pos = Position; G = Games played; AB = At bats; H = Hits; Avg. = Batting average; HR = Home runs; RBI = Runs batted in

Other batters
Note: Pos = Position; G = Games played; AB = At bats; H = Hits; Avg. = Batting average; HR = Home runs; RBI = Runs batted in

Pitching

Starting and other pitchers
Note: G = Games pitched; IP = Innings pitched; W = Wins; L = Losses; ERA = Earned run average; SO = Strikeouts

Relief pitchers
Note: G = Games pitched; W = Wins; L = Losses; SV = Saves; ERA = Earned run average; SO = Strikeouts

Award winners
 Roberto Alomar, Gold Glove Award
 Devon White, Gold Glove Award

All-Star Game
Roberto Alomar, 2B

Farm system

References

External links
1995 Toronto Blue Jays at Baseball Reference
1995 Toronto Blue Jays at Baseball Almanac

Toronto Blue Jays seasons
Toronto Blue Jays season
1995 in Canadian sports
1995 in Toronto